Events from the year 1890 in Denmark.

Incumbents
 Monarch – Christian IX
 Prime minister – J. B. S. Estrup

Events
 21 January – Folketing election

Sports
 Roskilde Roklub is founded.

Births
 12 June – Karl Jørgensen, actor (died 1956)
 1 November – Henry Nielsen, actor (died 1967)
 8 November – Prince Erik, Count of Rosenborg (died 1950)

Deaths
 22 November – Johanne Luise Heiberg, actress (born 1812)
21 December – Niels Gade, composer (born 1817)

References

 
1890s in Denmark
Denmark
Years of the 19th century in Denmark